Lockwood is a former village in the Canadian province of Saskatchewan. It was dissolved in 2002; its population is now counted as part of the rural municipality of Usborne. Lockwood is located on Highway 20 15 km north of the Town of Nokomis.

History
Prior to January 1, 2002, Lockwood was incorporated as a village, and was restructured as a hamlet under the jurisdiction of the Rural municipality of Usborne on that date.

Demographics 

See also 

 List of communities in Saskatchewan
 Hamlets of Saskatchewan

References

Usborne No. 310, Saskatchewan
Designated places in Saskatchewan
Former villages in Saskatchewan
Populated places disestablished in 2002
Unincorporated communities in Saskatchewan